Douleb is a small town in north-central Tunisia, belongs to Sbeitla in the Kasserine Governorate. It is well known by it oil field exploited by ETAP.

The Oil field of Douleb exports petrol in pipes of 6 inch's diameters.

References

Former populated places in Tunisia
Communes of Tunisia